The Realme Narzo 30 Pro 5G is an Android smartphone developed by Realme and was launched on 24 February 2021. It is the second smartphone among the Narzo 30 series unveiled by Realme. Narzo 30 Pro is available in two colours: Blade Silver and Sword Black.

Specifications

Hardware
The Realme Narzo 30 Pro uses the 5G-enabled MediaTek Dimensity 800U SoC. It has a 5000 mAh battery charging through the USB-C port and supports 30W Dart charging technology. The phone measures 162.2 × 75.1 × 9.1 mm and weighs 194 grams. The device features a 6.5 inch IPS LCD display with 120 Hz refresh rate and 180 Hz touch sampling. The display is protected by Corning Gorilla Glass 3.

Camera
The Narzo 30 Pro 5G has a triple-camera setup on the rear consisting of a 48 MP wide angle primary camera with ISOCELL Plus sensor, f/1.8 aperture, 79° field-of-view and up to 10x digital zoom, an 8 MP ultrawide camera with f/2.3 aperture and a 2 MP macro camera with f/2.4 aperture for close-up shots. The front-facing camera is a 16 MP unit with f/2.05 aperture and it is located in a cutout in the top left corner of the display.

Software
Realme Narzo 30 Pro runs on Realme UI based on Android 11. Now it's on Android 12.

See also 
 Realme
 Realme Narzo 20 Pro
 Realme 7

References 

Realme mobile phones
Android (operating system) devices
Mobile phones introduced in 2021
Mobile phones with 4K video recording
Mobile phones with multiple rear cameras